The following lists events that happened during 1988 in Armenia.

Incumbents
Prime Minister: Fadey Sargsyan

Events

February
 February 20 – The Nagorno-Karabakh Autonomous Oblast votes to secede from the Azerbaijan Soviet Socialist Republic and join the Armenian SSR, triggering the First Nagorno-Karabakh War.

March
 March 9 – Gorbachev meets with the leaders of Armenia and Azerbaijan Karen Demirchyan and Kamran Baghirov in Moscow to discuss the public demands of unification of Armenia and Karabakh.

November
 November 20 – Soviet Armenian Supreme Council recognizes the Armenian genocide.

December
 December 7 – The 6.8  Armenian earthquake leaves 25,000–50,000 dead and 31,000–130,000 injured.

Births
 June 2 – Rima Pipoyan, Armenian choreographer, director, dancer and dance teacher.

References

Bibliography

 
1980s in Armenia
Years of the 20th century in Armenia
Armenia
Armenia
Armenia
Armenia